The 2021 European Throwing Cup was hold on 8–9 May in Split, Croatia.

Results

Men

Seniors

U23

Women

Seniors

U23

Medal table

Team standings

Senior men

Senior women

Under 23 men

Under 23 women

References

External links
 
 EAA competition site
 Full results

European Throwing Cup
European Throwing Cup
European Throwing Cup
European Throwing Cup
European Throwing Cup